Jackeline Rentería Castillo (born February 23, 1986 in Cali, Colombia) is a female wrestler from Colombia. She won a bronze medal in the women's freestyle 55 kg at the 2008 Summer Olympics, and repeated the feat in the women's freestyle 55 kg category at the London 2012 Summer Olympics. She reached the semifinals in both tournaments, losing to the eventual silver medalists and winning the repechage bout. With her second medal she tied Helmut Bellingrodt, an Olympic Sports Shooter as the most decorated Colombian Olympian. In the Rio 2016 Olympics, they were joined by Óscar Figueroa in Weightlifting, Caterine Ibargüen in Triple Jump and Mariana Pajón in BMX. She is studying at the Pontificia Universidad Javeriana and also at the Universidad de Thomas Gomez.

References

External links
 

1986 births
Living people
Sportspeople from Cali
Colombian female sport wrestlers
Olympic wrestlers of Colombia
Wrestlers at the 2007 Pan American Games
Wrestlers at the 2015 Pan American Games
Wrestlers at the 2008 Summer Olympics
Wrestlers at the 2012 Summer Olympics
Wrestlers at the 2016 Summer Olympics
Olympic bronze medalists for Colombia
Olympic medalists in wrestling
Medalists at the 2012 Summer Olympics
Medalists at the 2008 Summer Olympics
Pan American Games gold medalists for Colombia
Pan American Games medalists in wrestling
South American Games gold medalists for Colombia
South American Games bronze medalists for Colombia
South American Games medalists in wrestling
Competitors at the 2018 South American Games
World Wrestling Championships medalists
Wrestlers at the 2019 Pan American Games
Medalists at the 2007 Pan American Games
Medalists at the 2015 Pan American Games
Medalists at the 2019 Pan American Games
21st-century Colombian women